Aïn Defla (is a wilaya (province) in northern Algeria. It is located to the southwest of Algiers, the capital. Localities in Ain Delfa include Aïn Defla, Miliana, El Attaf, Djelida and Djendel.

History
The province was created from Chlef Province in 1984.

Administrative divisions
It is made up of 14 districts and 36 municipalities.

The districts are:

 Aïn Defla
 Aïn Lechiakh
 Bathia
 Bordj El Amir Khaled
 Boumedfaâ
 Djendel
 Djelida
 El Abadia
 El Amra
 El Attaf
 Hammam Righa
 Khemis
 Miliana
 Rouina

The municipalities are:

 Aïn Bénian
 Aïn Bouyahia
 Aïn Defla
 Aïn Lechiakh
 Aïn Soltane
 Aïn Torki
 Arib
 Barbouche
 Bathia
 Bellas
 Ben Allal
 Bir Ould Khelifa
 Bordj Emir Khaled Chikh
 Bouchared
 Boumedfaa
 Djelida
 Djemaa Ouled
 Djendel
 El Abadia
 El Amra
 El Attaf
 El Hassania
 El Maine
 Hammam Righa
 Hoceinia
 Khemis Miliana
 Mekhatria
 Miliana
 Oued Chorfa
 Oued Djemaa
 Rouina
 Sidi Lakhdar
 Tacheta Zougagha
 Tarik Ibn Ziad
 Tiberkanine
 Zeddine

Notable people
 Mohamed Charef (1908-2011), theologian and mufti.
 Mohamed Belhocine (born 1951), Algerian medical scientist, professor of internal medicine and epidemiology.

References

 
Provinces of Algeria
States and territories established in 1984